Bird of the Year/Te Manu Rongonui o Te Tau is an annual election-based competition run by Forest & Bird to elect a "Bird of the Year" in New Zealand.

It draws support from well-known personalities including politicians, artists, actors, and celebrity chefs.

History 
Bird of the Year was created by the late Helen Bain who was Forest & Bird's communications manager. It launched in October 2005 as an online poll that featured in Forest & Bird's first email newsletter. Votes were collected by email and through the post. It included 76 native bird species and received a total of 900 votes.

In 2014, the competition was temporarily changed to Seabird of the Year and only seabirds were eligible.

BOTY 2021 
Seventy-seven species have been shortlisted as candidates. Voters will rank their top-five choices to decide which bird will be crowned Bird of the Year. The winner is determined using the instant-runoff voting method.

The controversial entry Pekapeka tou-roa/Long-tailed bat (since bats are not birds) has taken home the crown of New Zealand’s 2021 Bird of the Year announced on Breakfast show. Second place went to the Kākāpō, titipounamu got third, the kea was fourth and the toroa was fifth. The kakaruia, kororā, ruru, whio, and Rockhopper penguin made up the rest of the top 10.

BOTY 2022 
71 species have been shortlisted as candidates, with voting starting on the 17th of October.

Previous winners 

 First time Winner 
 Second time winner

Controversy 
In 2008, the successful campaign to elect kākāpō was accused by the takahē of accepting undeclared donations "from wealthy migratory birds living in Monaco." It was cleared by the fictional Serious Feathered Fraud Office.

In 2010, the kākāriki was accused of rigging the vote. Forest & Bird confirmed these concerns in 2011, committing to improving vote security.

In 2011, the emperor penguin was added to the competition for one year, when a juvenile bird was found on the Kapiti Coast. It had made national and international headlines after being rescued.

In 2015, two teenagers from Auckland made over 200 fraudulent votes for the kōkako. They used their father's business account to make fake email addresses.

In 2017, the competition suffered a further voting scandal when 112 fraudulent votes were made for the white-faced heron using internet bots from an IP address in Christchurch.

In 2018, an independent scrutineer from Dragonfly Data Science was brought in to prevent further voting scandals. Despite this, a third voting scandal surfaced when 310 fraudulent votes were placed for the black shag. These were traced to Australia.

In 2020, 1500 fraudulent votes were placed for the Little spotted kiwi using fake email addresses from the same IP address, briefly pushing it to the top of the leaderboard before the fraudulent votes were discovered.

In 2021, the long-tailed bat was added to the competition, with mixed responses from candidates and voters who criticised the fact that it was not a bird. The controversial entry Pekapeka tou-roa/Long-tailed bat took the crown of New Zealand’s 2021 Bird of the Year.

Celebrity endorsements

References 

Nature conservation in New Zealand
Competitions in New Zealand